Ascension is the name of two sculptures created in 1978 and 1986 by Luxembourgish sculptor Lucien Wercollier.

First version 
A first version of the sculpture was completed in 1978. It had been ordered by the government of Luxembourg as a gift to the Kennedy Center in Washington, D.C. It is sculpted from pink marble and can be found in the concert hall.

Second version 
Eight years later, in 1986, a second version made of bronze was erected in front of the city hall in Strassen, Luxembourg, on a granite pedestal inscribed . The sculpture itself is signed .

See also
 List of public art in Washington, D.C., Ward 2

References

1978 sculptures
1986 sculptures
European sculpture
Strassen, Luxembourg
Outdoor sculptures in Washington, D.C.
Bronze sculptures in Luxembourg
Marble sculptures in Washington, D.C.
1978 establishments in Washington, D.C.
1980s establishments in Luxembourg